The Last Berliner (Der letzte Mieter) is a 2018 German hostage drama film set in contemporary Berlin. It won the award for the Best Feature Film at the 5th Manchester International Festival in July 2019.

Plot
A housing company evicts its tenants, intending to turn their homes into luxury apartments. Dietmar Heine, an ailing pensioner living in an old flat in former East Berlin, is unwilling to comply. The day he is supposed to leave, his son Tobias returns home to find Dietmar quarrelling with their landlord. The argument escalates, Dietmar shoots himself, and an angry Tobias takes the landlord and a police officer hostage. The film follows the three of them, as Tobias tries to stop the evictions, and the police try to save the hostages.

Critical Reception
Marie O'Sullivan, for The Movie Isle, called The Last Berliner a 'surprising gem' that 'manages to be funny, tense, sad and sympathetic at the same time'.

References

External links 

2018 films
German crime drama films
2010s German films